Orda is a rural locality (a selo) and the administrative center of Ordinsky District of Perm Krai, Russia, located on the Kungur River (a tributary of the Iren River. Population: 

Orda was first mentioned in written sources in 1662. It has served as the administrative center of Ordinsky District since 1924, with a brief interruption in 1963–1965.
It is named for the Ordynka River. 

Near Orda is the only entrance to the Orda Cave, one of the longest underwater caves and the largest underwater gypsum cave in the world. Orati plowing the land in Slavic and Baltic languages ,orda plowed land

References

Rural localities in Perm Krai
Osinsky Uyezd